Tawiah is both a surname and a given name. Notable people with the name include:

Surname:
Beverly Tawiah, English singer, better known as Tawiah
Erasmus Ransford Tawiah Madjitey (1920–1996), Ghanaian police officer, diplomat and politician
Michael Tawiah (born 1990), Ghanaian footballer

Given name:
Tawiah Modibo Ocran (1942–2008), Ghanaian academic and judge

Tawiah is a Ghanaian name given to the first child born after twins.

Akan given names
Surnames of Akan origin